Trefethen Family Vineyards is a winery in Napa Valley. It was established in 1968.

History
Part of the current company's vineyards can be traced back to the winery Eshcol, a biblical word for “lush cluster of grapes.” The original Eschol winery was commissioned by James and George Goodman and constructed in 1886 by a Scottish sea captain named Hamden McIntyre. The original estate was 280 acres with 40 acres planted in vineyards.  McIntyre designed it as a gravity-flow system: a horse-drawn winch brought grapes to the third floor of the three-story structure for crushing; gravity carried the juice to the second floor for fermenting; and, eventually, the wine descended to the first floor for aging.  The vineyards survived Prohibition in the United States by producing grapes for the production of sacramental wine.  By 1940, the vineyards and winery building fell into disuse. The Eschol building suffered extensive structural damage from the 2014 South Napa earthquake. The winery building was restored from earthquake damage following over two years of repairs and improvements.

Following retirement from a successful career with Kaiser Industries, Eugene Trefethen along with his wife Katie purchased Eshcol in 1968 along with six adjoining properties to create Trefethen Vineyards.  At that time, replanting of the vineyards and restoration of  the historic winery building began. The Trefethens' restoration efforts were recognized in 1988 by the Department of the Interior, which placed the winery on the National Register of Historic Places as the only 19th-century, wooden, gravity-flow winery surviving in Napa County.  The winery is also known for an extensive garden established by Katie.  It has been featured in many publications and has been a destination for many gardening enthusiasts since it was created.

Eugene Trefethen died in 1996 and Katie Trefethen died in 2007.

Awards
In 1979, a Wine Olympics was organized by the French wine and food magazine, Gault Millau. A total of 330 wines from 33 countries were evaluated by 62 experts from ten countries. The 1976 Trefethen Vineyards Chardonnay won first place in that category and was judged best in the world.

References

Sources

Trefethen Vineyards
Trefethen Vineyards Reviews

Industrial buildings completed in 1886
Food and drink companies established in 1968
Wineries in Napa Valley
Agricultural buildings and structures on the National Register of Historic Places in California
National Register of Historic Places in Napa County, California
Agricultural buildings and structures on the National Register of Historic Places
1968 establishments in California